The Holmes-Crafts Homestead is a historic house at the southern junction of Old Jay Hill Road and Main Street (Maine State Route 4) in Jay, Maine.  Built in the early 19th century, it is a well-preserved local example of Federal architecture, and was home to James Starr, one of the first settlers of the area and a prominent local lawyer and politician.  The building, now owned by the local historical society, was listed on the National Register of Historic Places in 1973.

Description and history
The Holmes-Crafts Homestead is a two-story wood-frame structure, five bays wide, with a hip roof and two chimneys placed near the rear.  A gable-roofed ell extends to the rear of the main block.  The house has retained a large amount of is exterior finish, including original clapboards and windows.  The main entrance has a Federal style surround with sidelight windows and a carved panel above.  The interior has equally well-preserved wide pine floors and original door and window hardware.

The house is known to have been standing in 1820, when it was purchased by James Starr, a lawyer and surveyor who was one of the first white settlers to arrive in the Jay Hill area in 1802.  Starr also operated a tavern nearby, served as the town's first postmaster, and represented it in the state legislature. The property was purchased in 1833 by Aruna Holmes, Starr's son-in-law, who was a cabinetmaker.  He had a shop which extended from the house's ell, but is no longer standing.  The house is now owned by the Jay Historical Society, and is open by appointment.

See also
National Register of Historic Places listings in Franklin County, Maine

References

External links
Jay Historical Society

Houses on the National Register of Historic Places in Maine
Federal architecture in Maine
Houses completed in 1820
Houses in Franklin County, Maine
Historic house museums in Maine
Museums in Franklin County, Maine
National Register of Historic Places in Franklin County, Maine
Jay, Maine